Lake Mogotoyevo is a coastal lake in Allaikhovsky District, Sakha Republic, Russia.

Geography
The Bogdashkina river mouth lies to the west of the lake and Gusinaya Bay to the southeast.

Fauna
In the lake, large numbers of omul, Siberian ryapushka and nelma can be found. It is a breeding place for the Siberian crane (Grus leucogeranus).

References 

Lakes of the Sakha Republic
East Siberian Lowland